19-2 is a French-Canadian police drama television series. Set in Montreal, the show centres on the professional and personal lives of patrol officers from Poste 19 of the Service Police Metropolitan, a fictitious version of the Service de police de la Ville de Montréal. The series name comes from the callsign of the patrol car of the main characters.

It aired on public broadcaster Radio-Canada starting in 2011 and concluded in 2015. An English-language adaptation premiered on Bravo on January 29, 2014 and concluded production in 2017. The fourth and final season of the English version premiered on CTV in Canada on July 31, 2017.

Synopsis
Nicolai "Nick" Berrof and his partner Jean-Pierre Harvey are shot responding to a burglary. While Berrof is spared by his body armour, Harvey is shot in the head and left hospitalized for life. Replacing Harvey is Benoît Chartier, a veteran constable from the Sûreté du Québec, who transferred to Montreal to escape troubles in his hometown. As officers from Poste 19 deal with the challenges of police work, they struggle with their own personal challenges as well. Chartier is estranged from his family after he personally arrests his own father for drunk driving. Berrof struggles with his divorce with his colleague and wife Detective Isabelle Latendresse. Tyler Joseph struggles with alcoholism. Jean-Marc Brouillard abuses his wife. Commander Marcel Gendron struggles to protect the station's image in the face of pressure from the public and his superiors alike.

By the end of the first season, Chartier's former employer, the SQ, assigns him to find a mole within the station. The second season centres around his hunt for the mole with Berrof being the prime suspect. After being gravely wounded in a shooting, Tyler attempts to defeat his alcoholism. Brouillard and Pouliot build a relationship after having been partnered together. And Gendron's daughter disappears amidst the discovery of a child pornography ring.

The third season begins in the aftermath of the mole's suicide. Having taken the hunt for the mole to the extreme, Berrof must deal with the consequences of his actions. Chartier, betrothed to Berrof's sister, unwittingly becomes the target of Berrof's powerful enemies. Berrof becomes implicated deeper and deeper into Montreal's underworld as his crime-troubled past and law enforcement present collide.

Characters
 Claude Legault as Benoît "Ben" Chartier
 Réal Bossé as Nicolaï "Nick" Berrof
 Benz Antoine as Tyler Joseph
 Véronique Beaudet as Bérengère Hamelin
 Sylvain Marcel as Sergent Julien Houle
 Catherine Bérubé as Audrey Pouliot
 Vincent Graton as Jean-Pierre Harvey
 Julie Perreault as Sergent-detective Isabelle Latendresse
 Louis Philippe Dandenault as Jean-Marc Brouillard
 Fred-Éric Salvail as Vincent "Vince" Légaré
 Jean Petitclerc as Marcel Gendron
 Robert Naylor as Théo
 Magalie Lépine-Blondeau as Amélie De Grandpré
 Fanny Mallette as Catherine
 Louise Portal as Marie-Louise
 Marc-François Blondin as Sylvio
 Sarah Dagenais-Hakim as Josée Martel
 Marie-Évelyne Lessard as Valérie Jean

Episodes
The original French version started filming in 2010 and premiered on 2 February 2011 and ended on 6 April 2011. 39% of Quebeckers were watching the pilot when it aired. On 15 June 2011, the chain renewed the contract for another season, which was filmed in 2012 and premiered on 28 January 2013. It ended on 1 April 2013. By the end of 2013, Radio-Canada ordered a third season to be produced, which was filmed in 2014 and premiered on 28 January 2015. The series finale aired on 1 April 2015.

Reception
Reviews have been positive overall. Police officers in Quebec have liked the series, seeing a way to make viewers more aware of their daily lives.

During the first season, the show attracted about 1.3 million viewers per week, which made it the most popular series in Quebec of the winter. It peaked at  viewers on 23 February 2011, and the season finale got  viewers, the top in its time slot.

In its second season, critics unanimously praised the first episode, which was based on the 2006 Dawson College shooting. It was watched by  viewers, about 39 percent of the viewers that evening in Quebec. (A shot-for-shot remake of this episode, filmed at the same school and also directed by Daniel Grou (Podz), was broadcast as the second-season premiere of the English version of the series.)

The series has been nominated for several awards, including the Prix Artis and the Zapettes d'Or. The series, with 18 nominations at the Gémeaux 2011, and won 12 at the gala that took place on 18 September 2011.

Notes

References

External links

  Radio-Canada: 19-2

2011 Canadian television series debuts
2015 Canadian television series endings
Ici Radio-Canada Télé original programming
Television shows set in Montreal
Television shows filmed in Montreal
2010s Canadian crime drama television series
Canadian police procedural television series